These are the results for the girls' individual event at the 2018 Summer Youth Olympics.

Results

References
Fencing ranking round Results
Swimming Results
Fencing bonus round Results
Laser-Run Results
Overall Results

Modern pentathlon at the 2018 Summer Youth Olympics